Events in the year 1667 in Norway.

Incumbents
Monarch: Frederick III

Events
Fredriksberg Fortress is established.

Arts and literature
Leksvik Church is built.

Births

Full date unknown
Anna Colbjørnsdatter, national heroine (d.1736)

Deaths
5 May – Georg Reichwein, Sr., military officer (b. 1593),

See also

References